Lepidochrysops miniata is a butterfly in the family Lycaenidae. It is found in Zambia. The habitat consists of miombo woodland.

Adults feed from the flowers of Ocimum species. They have been recorded on wing in September.

The larvae feed on Ocimum homblei.

References

Butterflies described in 2004
Lepidochrysops
Endemic fauna of Zambia
Butterflies of Africa